Diary of a Nymphomaniac is a 2008 Spanish erotic drama film directed by Christian Molina and starring Belén Fabra and Leonardo Sbaraglia. It is based on the 2005 autobiographical novel Insatiable: The Sexual Adventures of a French Girl in Spain by French author Valérie Tasso. In the United States and the United Kingdom, the film was released under the title Insatiable: Diary of a Sex Addict.

Plot
Val is a 28-year-old woman with a strong desire for sex. She often has sex with multiple men, including Alex, who has a girlfriend. Tired of Val's voracious sexual appetite, Alex angrily breaks up with her after a night of wild lovemaking. Val later goes to an empty train station, where she meets a stranger and has sex with him.

Val is also disturbed by her own excessive sexual appetite. She discusses her sex life openly with her grandmother, who encourages her to do as she pleases. She also suggests that Val keep a diary as it can help provide clarity. Val works in the marketing department of a firm in Barcelona. When her old friend, Hassan, visits Barcelona, she leaves work early in order to have sex with him. The following day, Val shows up late for work, which eventually leads to her dismissal from the job.

Val attends a couple of job interviews. The second interviewer, Jaime, becomes attracted to Val and asks her out; she immediately accepts. Against her usual self, Val decides not to sleep with him after their first date. Jaime immediately buys an expensive home for them to live, though Val is worried about his extravagant lifestyle. In the meantime, Val visits her grandmother, who is ill and eventually dies.

Val and Jaime move in together. When they sleep together for the first time, Val is disappointed by Jaime's performance in bed, but she brushes it off. She also lands a job from her first interview. However, Val soon realizes that Jaime is bipolar, switching between acting affectionately towards her and abusing her. One day, Jaime walks into Val's office unannounced and accuses her boss of sleeping with her. On another occasion, he brings a prostitute to their house and asks Val to pay her. Val decides to leave Jaime and move out of their house. When Val is packing her belongings with the help of her friend Sonia, Jaime shows up and threatens to assault Val. They manage to leave and go to Sonia's house.

One day, Sonia realizes that Val left her house without informing her. Sonia tracks her down to a small run-down apartment. Unemployed and having lost all her savings to pay for Jaime's extravagant lifestyle, a depressed Val attempts to commit suicide by jumping down from her apartment, but eventually decides against it. Desperate for money, Val decides to work as a prostitute in a brothel, where the madam controls all the women working for her. Val meets a Brazilian woman, Cindy, who works for the same brothel and they become close.

Val starts to enjoy her work and soon attracts regular customers, including an Italian named Giovanni, with whom she falls in love. When he books her again, Val gets excited, but when she goes to meet him in his hotel suite, he has decided to give her to his friend. Pedro, another customer, keeps on telling her that he loves her and wants to marry her, but he tries to control her with his money and wants to have aggressive sex with her. Without bothering to collect her money, Val runs away from his hotel suite. When she returns to the brothel the following day, Cindy kills herself by jumping out from a window.

Val starts to re-evaluate her life and soon decides this is not the life she wants. She informs the madam that she wants to leave the brothel. Though the madam tries to convince her to stay and then abuses her and threatens her, Val is determined and leaves the brothel.

Val goes to Sonia's house. Sonia is happily married to a man, and Val informs her that she has left the brothel. Sonia is very happy for Val. When Val returns to her apartment, she sees a man living in her apartment building who she noticed peeping on her earlier. She asks him if he wants to go to her place. He replies that he does not have any money, to which she replies, "That's okay, it's not necessary", indicating that she has resorted to her old way of free-spirited living.

Cast 
 Belén Fabra as Val
 Leonardo Sbaraglia as Jaime
 Ángela Molina as Cristina
 Llum Barrera as Sonia
 Antonio Garrido as Giovanni
 Geraldine Chaplin as Abuela (Grandmother)

Reception 

The movie received mixed reviews. Jay Seaver of eFilmCritic.com wrote: "...while I still think it hangs around those [art-porn] stereotypes enough to be somewhat hurt by them, I did find the film improving in my mind as I reflected on it".

Nathan Southern wrote for TV Guide: "Though competently acted, well scored, and lushly photographed...Christian Molina’s...erotic drama...represents an ugly and pretentious blight on the face of its chosen subgenre".

Jonathan Henderson of Cinelogue stated: "[T]he film...in its heavy-handed crudeness...plays out like a typical, manipulative melodrama. ...Another element that plagues the film is its unrealistic depictions of misogynistic men. [It] is marked by an overtly formulaic script, which too neatly follows the three-act structure with a pattern of introduction, elation, conflict, descent and recovery. The film’s pacing problems are exacerbated by a profusion of abbreviated, deficient scenes which interrupt the flow of the narrative. [Belén] Fabra’s performance during [her] emotional scenes is nearly strong enough to make me forget about the manipulative mawkishness behind them".

References

External links 
 
 
 
 
 Valérie Tasso's personal website

2008 films
2008 drama films
2000s erotic drama films
2000s Spanish-language films
Films about prostitution in Spain
Films about sex addiction
Films based on autobiographical novels
Films scored by Roque Baños
Films set in Barcelona
Films shot in Barcelona
Films shot in Madrid
Spanish erotic drama films
2000s Spanish films